Adenosine Tri-Phosphate may refer to:

 Adenosine Tri-Phosphate (band)
 Adenosine triphosphate (chemical)